Eekman is a surname. Notable people with the surname include:

Kazuma Eekman, Dutch-Japanese artist
Nicolas Eekman (1889–1973), Dutch painter
Tim Eekman (born 1991), Dutch footballer

See also
Ekman